The Lone Gunmen is an American conspiracy fiction thriller drama television series created by Chris Carter, Vince Gilligan, John Shiban, and Frank Spotnitz. It is a spin-off of Carter's science fiction television series The X-Files and as such is part of The X-Files franchise, starring several of the show's characters. Despite positive reviews, its ratings dropped, and the show was canceled after thirteen episodes. The last episode ended on a cliffhanger which was partially resolved in a ninth season episode of The X-Files entitled "Jump the Shark".

The series revolves around the titular trio The Lone Gunmen: Melvin Frohike, John Fitzgerald Byers, and Richard Langly, private investigators who run a conspiracy theory magazine. They had often helped FBI Special Agent Fox Mulder on The X-Files.

Series overview
Whereas The X-Files deals mainly with paranormal events and conspiracies to cover up extraterrestrial contact, The Lone Gunmen draws on secret activity of other kinds, such as government-sponsored terrorism, the development of a surveillance society, corporate crime, and escaped Nazis. The show has a light mood and elements of slapstick comedy. The trio are alternately aided and hindered by a mysterious thief named Yves Adele Harlow.

Similarities to 9/11 attacks in pilot storyline
In the pilot episode, which aired March 4, 2001 (six months prior to the September 11 attacks), rogue members of the U.S. government remotely hijack an airliner departing Boston, planning to crash it into the World Trade Center, and let anti-American terrorist groups take credit, to gain support for a profitable new war following the Cold War. The heroes ultimately override the controls, foiling the plot.

Characters

 John Fitzgerald Byers: Portrayed by Bruce Harwood. Byers was born in Sterling, Virginia on November 22, 1963, the day John F. Kennedy was assassinated, and was named after the fallen president – his parents were originally planning to name him Bertram after his father. Byers idolized his namesake, but he always had suspicions about the real cause of his death. Byers worked as a public affairs officer for the Federal Communications Commission (FCC) in Baltimore until May 1989. Byers appears to have some working knowledge of medicine, genetics, and chemistry.
 Melvin Frohike: Portrayed by Tom Braidwood. Frohike was born circa 1945 in Pontiac, Michigan. Prior to joining the Lone Gunmen, he was an acclaimed tango dancer in Miami. On giving up the tango, he toured the country with hippies before founding Frohike Electronics Corp., specializing in cable intrusion hardware.
 Richard "Ringo" Langly: Portrayed by Dean Haglund. Langly was born 1965 in Saltville, Nebraska. He showed an aptitude for computers from an early age, which was frowned upon by his parents. Langly is The Lone Gunmen's expert in computers, hacking and programming. He is possibly the most paranoid of the Gunmen, taping all incoming phone calls, including those from Fox Mulder.
 Yves Adele Harlow: Portrayed by Zuleikha Robinson. Harlow is a femme fatale thief who sometimes works with the Lone Gunmen trio (although sometimes she is their rival). The alias Yves Adele Harlow is an anagram for Lee Harvey Oswald. It was later revealed in The X-Files episode "Jump the Shark" that Yves' real name is Lois Runtz.
 Jimmy Bond: Portrayed by Stephen Snedden. Though Bond shares the bravery and physicality of his namesake, he initially appears to be rich but not very bright, and is fascinated with the Lone Gunmen, who often consider him a nuisance but appreciate his financial backing to support The Lone Gunman magazine. His saving grace is his boundless optimism, coupled with an idealistic view that the jaded Gunmen wish they still held.

Production
The series was filmed in Vancouver, British Columbia, Canada, and in New York City, New York, United States.

Episodes

Season 1 (2001)

"Jump the Shark" (The X-Files episode)

Home video release
Fox Home Entertainment officially released the series on a three-disc Region 1 DVD set, including the ninth season episode of The X-Files titled "Jump the Shark" (which finishes the cliffhanger that ended The Lone Gunmen) as an additional episode. It was released in the United States on March 29, 2005, and in the UK on January 31, 2006.

Reception and impact

Reviews
The Lone Gunmen received generally favorable reviews from critics. Julie Salamon of The New York Times gave it a favorable review, stating it is "well done: shrewdly filmed, edited and written". Los Angeles Times writer Howard Rosenberg gave the series a moderately positive review, saying a "bit of it is pretty funny". Aaron Beierle, writing for DVD Talk, awarded the show 4 stars out of 5. Beierle considered the stories "enjoyable, intelligent and well-written" and described the characters as "terrifically memorable". Eric Profancik, writing for DVD Verdict, stated the material is "pretty good" and described the plots as "strong and unusual stories".

About the show's reception, Vince Gilligan, the co-creator of the show, said: "I have such fondness for The Lone Gunmen. I think it ended way too soon. I was crushed when The Lone Gunmen got canceled after its first season. The Lone Gunmen to this day is a show I’m still proud of, and I will always be proud of. It sort of points to an interesting phenomenon about television – you can’t really tell in advance whether a show is going to work for an audience. I would hold The Lone Gunmen up against anything that I have done before or since. For some reason, timing I guess, being the best thing to point to, it just didn’t click with an audience. If The Lone Gunmen had come on maybe a couple of years earlier, or a couple of years later, maybe it would have clicked." He also said: "my absolute belief is that we learn from failure, we don’t learn from success. And that show was in strict terms a failure. Certainly it only lasted 13 episodes and then was out. But I am still proud of that show and we had a lot of fun making it. But the 'failure' of that show–and I use semi finger quotes around the word failure because I enjoyed what we did with it—it doesn't really tell me much going forward. Because so much of television I really believe comes down to timing."

Nielsen ratings

Although the debut episode garnered 13.23 million viewers, its ratings began to steadily drop.

Awards
The pilot episode earned a CSC Award by the Canadian Society of Cinematographers for Best Cinematography – TV Drama by Robert McLachlan.

References

External links
 
 
 
 

2001 American television series debuts
2001 American television series endings
2000s American comedy-drama television series
2000s American comic science fiction television series
English-language television shows
Fox Broadcasting Company original programming
Television series by 20th Century Fox Television
Television series created by Chris Carter
Television series created by Vince Gilligan
Television shows set in Maryland
American television spin-offs
The X-Files (franchise)
Television series about conspiracy theories
Television shows filmed in Vancouver